The Acropolis International Tournament 2015 was a basketball tournament held in OAKA Indoor Hall in Athens, Greece, from August 27 until August 29, 2015. It was the 27th edition of the Acropolis International Basketball Tournament. The four participating teams were Greece, Turkey, Lithuania, and Netherlands.

Venues

Participating teams

Standings 

|-bgcolor="gold"

|}

Results 
All times are local Central European Summer Time (UTC+2).

Final standing

References

External links

Acropolis Cup 2015 Results

Acropolis
Acropolis International Basketball Tournament
2015–16 in Greek basketball
2015–16 in Lithuanian basketball